The Mainz Institute of Microtechnology (in German: Institut für Mikrotechnik Mainz, IMM) is a research-intensive, publicly held company owned by the German federal state of Rhineland-Palatinate. Its main areas of specialization are microfluidic systems for industrial, environmental and biomedical analysis and chemical processes technology and engineering.

References

External links
Official website

Chemical companies of Germany
Organisations based in Rhineland-Palatinate
Companies based in Mainz